Alexander Weckström (born 27 March 1987) is a Finnish footballer. He has played for Finnish football team IFK Mariehamn. He is 5'9" tall. His elder brother is Kristoffer Weckström.
And he's now registered for Rynninge IK.

He also played for Åland Islands in the 2009 Island games scoring three goals, one each against Shetland, Greenland and the Isle of Man.

References

1987 births
Living people
Sportspeople from Åland
Finnish footballers
Rynninge IK players
Association football forwards